NMDA receptor modulators (glutamate modulators) are a new form of antipsychotic that are in Phase II FDA studies. The first compound studied was glycine which was hypothesized by Daniel Javitt after observation that people with phencyclidine(PCP)-induced psychosis were lacking in glutamate transmission. (PCP is an NMDA receptor antagonist that blocks glutamate.) In giving glycine to people with PCP-induced psychosis a recovery rate was noted. From there, it was hypothesized that people with psychosis from schizophrenia would benefit from increased glutamate transmission and glycine was added with strong recovery rates noted especially in the area of negative and cognitive symptoms. Glycine, however, sporadic results aside (dose 60 g/day or 0.8 g/kg, approximately the amount in 300 g of gelatin powder or two kilograms of sunflower seeds) remains an adjunct antipsychotic and an unworkable compound. However, the Eli Lilly and Company study drug LY-2140023 is being studied as a primary antipsychotic and is showing strong recovery rates, especially in the area of negative and cognitive symptoms of schizophrenia. Tardive dyskinesia, diabetes and other standard complications have not been noted:
Treatment with LY2140023, like treatment with olanzapine, was safe and well-tolerated; treated patients showed statistically significant improvements in both positive and negative symptoms of schizophrenia compared to placebo (P = 0.001 at week 4). Notably, patients treated with LY-2140023 did not differ from placebo-treated patients with respect to prolactin elevation, extrapyramidal symptoms or weight gain. These data suggest that mGlu2/3 receptor agonists have antipsychotic properties and may provide a new alternative for the treatment of schizophrenia.

Other NMDA receptor modulators are being studied and this modality of treatment may once approved as antipsychotic medications gradually replace the current (dopaminergic) antipsychotics.

References

External links

NMDA receptor agonists